was a town located in Kitauwa District, Ehime Prefecture, Japan.

As of 2003, the town had an estimated population of 12,418 and a density of 257.85 persons per km2. The total area was 48.16 km2.

On August 1, 2005, Yoshida, along with the towns of Mima and Tsushima (all from Kitauwa District), was merged into the expanded city of Uwajima.

External links
Uwajima official website in Japanese

Dissolved municipalities of Ehime Prefecture
Uwajima, Ehime